Samuel Smith (4 January 1836 – 28 December 1906) was a British politician. He served as a Liberal Member of Parliament (MP) from 1882 to 1885 and from 1886 to 1906. He was noted for being a champion of "social purity" and opposed many plays with open displays of sexuality that he saw as "glorification of the vulgarest debauchery". Targets included the plays The Gay Lord Quex and Zaza.

Life
Born near Borgue, Galloway, he was educated at Borgue parish school and Kirkcudbright Academy before attending Edinburgh University.  His grand-father and his uncle, both named Samuel Smith, were each parish minister of Borgue. The former (d. 1816) wrote 'A General View of the Agriculture of Galloway' (1806); the latter seceded at the disruption of the Scottish church in 1843. He was apprenticed to a Liverpool cotton broker in 1853.  By 1864 he was head of the Liverpool branch of James Finlay & Co., a large cotton business of Glasgow and Bombay.

Smith was first elected to Parliament on 11 December 1882 in a by-election in Liverpool, following the Conservative MP Viscount Sandon's succession to the Peerage as Earl of Harrowby on 19 November 1882. The three-seat Liverpool constituency was split for the 1885 general election and Smith stood in the new Liverpool Abercromby seat. However, he lost to the Conservative candidate William Lawrence by 807 votes. He returned to Parliament in a by-election in Flintshire on 3 March 1886. This by-election followed the elevation to the Peerage of Lord Richard Grosvenor. Smith remained the seat's MP until he retired at the 1906 general election. He died later that year aged 70 at Calcutta, India.

Edge Hill University has a hall of residence called Smith in honour of his contribution to the institution. He co-founded the university in 1885.

References

British Parliamentary Election Results 1885–1918, compiled and edited by F.W.S. Craig (The Macmillan Press 1974)

External links 

 

1836 births
1906 deaths
Liberal Party (UK) MPs for Welsh constituencies
Members of the Parliament of the United Kingdom for Liverpool
UK MPs 1880–1885
UK MPs 1885–1886
UK MPs 1886–1892
UK MPs 1892–1895
UK MPs 1895–1900
UK MPs 1900–1906
People from Dumfries and Galloway
Alumni of the University of Edinburgh